The 49ers' flagship radio stations are Cumulus Media's KSAN 107.7 FM ("The Bone") in San Jose, while KNBR/FM 680 AM/104.5 FM, and KTCT 1050 AM serve as the San Francisco/Oakland flagships. KSAN airs all 49ers games on FM. On AM, they are simulcast on KTCT in August, September, and October and on KNBR from October to the end of the season. Joe Starkey, best known as the voice of the University of California and The Play, was previously the color commentator on the broadcasts next to legendary announcer Lon Simmons in 1987 and 1988 and took over as lead commentator in 1989. Lon Simmons and Gordy Soltau did the broadcasts on KSFO in the 1949s and 1960s. For a brief period in the late 1970s and early 1980s Don Klein, "the voice of Stanford", did the 49ers' games. Starkey first teamed with former Detroit Lions' and KPIX Sports Director, Wayne Walker and then former 49ers' linebacker Gary Plummer formed the broadcast team from 1998 to 2008, with Starkey retiring after the 2008 season. Ted Robinson replaced Starkey and teamed up with Plummer for the 2009 and 2010 seasons. Plummer was relieved of his color commentating duties for the 2011 season and replaced by former teammate Eric Davis. Tim Ryan replaced Davis in 2014. Greg Papa, the longtime voice of the then-Bay Area rival Oakland Raiders, replaced Robinson on play-by-play in 2019.

Pre-season games not shown on national television are shown on CBS owned-and-operated station KPIX-TV (channel 5), along with select Sunday telecasts on CBS during the regular season. When playing in the regular season, those games can be televised on Fox owned-and-operated station KTVU (channel 2). KGO-TV (channel 7) owned-and-operated station of ABC airs select "Monday Night Football" telecasts. NBC owned-and-operated station KNTV (channel 11) airs Sunday Night Football broadcasts.

Radio announcers
Source: San Francisco 49ers Football on the Radio (1946–2008) – Bay Area Radio Museum & Hall of Fame.

Radio network
Source:

California

Hawaii

Nevada

Oregon

Reference

San Francisco 49ers
 
Broadcasters
San Francisco 49ers